Roberts Plūme (born 6 March 2000) is a Latvian luger. He competed in the Men's Doubles and Team relay events at the 2022 Winter Olympics and got the bronze medal in the latter competition alongside his teammates Elīza Tīruma, Kristers Aparjods, and Mārtiņš Bots.

References

External links
 
 
 
 

2000 births
Living people
Latvian male lugers
Olympic lugers of Latvia
Olympic bronze medalists for Latvia
Olympic medalists in luge
Lugers at the 2022 Winter Olympics
Medalists at the 2022 Winter Olympics
Sportspeople from Riga
21st-century Latvian people